Princess Louise Hollandine of the Palatinate (18 April 1622 – 11 February 1709) was a painter and abbess. She was a daughter of Frederick V of the Palatinate, the "Winter King" of Bohemia, and Scottish princess Elizabeth Stuart, daughter of King James VI and I. She is also known for her romantic involvement with the Marquess of Montrose.

Early life 
Born in April 1622, Louise Hollandine was born at the Hague Palace in Holland, as her father was living in exile at the court of his uncle, Maurice, Prince of Orange. She was his sixth child and second daughter by his wife Princess Elizabeth Stuart, eldest daughter of King James VI and I of England and sister of King Charles I. Her parents had lost their Electoral lands and the crown of Bohemia, resulting in exile. She was given the name Hollandine to show appreciation to Frederick's uncles, the Princes of Orange, for protecting the family in exile.

She studied primarily in Leiden at the 'Prinsenhof', and reportedly began drawing lessons at age six, and became devoted to portraiture. She was taught in the Calvinist tradition according to the Heidelberg Catechism.

Montrose romance 
Louise is said to have had a love-affair with James Graham, 1st Marquess of Montrose (originally Earl of Montrose), a Scottish Cavalier soldier and poet. Montrose, a revered national hero, won many outstanding military victories until ultimately being hung, drawn and quartered in 1650.

Conversion 

For unknown reasons and to the dismay of her Protestant family, in December 1657 she fled to France with the assistance of her aunt by marriage Henrietta Maria of France and converted to the Roman Catholic faith. On 25 March 1659 she became a novice and on 19 September 1660 a nun in the Cistercian Maubuisson Abbey. With the support of King Louis XIV, she became Abbess of Maubuisson in August 1664. Her mother Elizabeth Stuart attempted to have Louise arrested and returned, and her conversion created lifelong animosity. Louise Hollandine was the only child to be left out of Elizabeth Stuart's will. Her brother Edward supported her conversion, as he had converted to Catholicism and lived in France as well.

Painting 
Louise Hollandine was a talented portrait painter and graphic artist, a talent that she shared with her brother, Prince Rupert. She was student of Gerard van Honthorst and painted so ably in his style that some of her works were attributed to him.

As abbess, she continued painting and used her abbey's wealth and her family's lineage to make charitable donations to English Benedictine nuns, including a Madonna and Child painting she created in 1691, which was hung in the Lady Chapel.

As a painter, the princess is considered an "amateur". The portraits she painted are often in the Baroque style of Honthorst, but there are exceptions, which were likely not commissioned. Her works were generally kept within her family, and some can now be found in German museums.

Ancestry

References

External links

 

|-

House of Palatinate-Simmern
German Baroque painters
17th-century German painters
Artists from The Hague
German Roman Catholics
Converts to Roman Catholicism from Calvinism
1622 births
1709 deaths
Princesses of the Palatinate
Louise Hollandine
17th-century Bohemian women
17th-century Bohemian people
17th-century German women
17th-century German people
German women painters
French Roman Catholic abbesses
17th-century French nuns
Daughters of kings